Caragobius is a genus of gobies native to Asia and the western Pacific Ocean.

Species
There are currently three recognized species in this genus:
 Caragobius burmanicus (Hora, 1926) (Burmese geel goby)
 Caragobius rubristriatus (Saville-Kent, 1889) (Red eelgoby)
 Caragobius urolepis (Bleeker, 1852) (Scaleless worm goby)

References

Amblyopinae